Braciola (plural braciole ) may refer to several distinct dishes in Italian cuisine.

Cut of meat
Braciola may refer to an Italian dish, consisting of slices of meat that are pan-fried or grilled, often in their own juice or in a small amount of light olive oil. They are different from the finer cut fettine ("small/thin slices"), which never have bone and are generally thinner.

Involtini
In Sicilian cuisine, Italian-American cuisine and Italian Australian cuisine, braciola (plural braciole) are thin slices of meat (typically pork, chicken, beef, or swordfish) that are rolled as a roulade (this category of rolled food is known as involtini in Italian) with cheese and bread crumbs and fried.  In Sicilian, this dish is also called bruciuluni.

Braciole can be cooked along with meatballs and Italian sausage in a Neapolitan ragù or tomato sauce, which some call sarsa or succu (Sicilian), or 'Sunday gravy' in some areas of the northeastern United States.  They can also be prepared without tomato sauce. There exist many variations on the recipe, including variations of cheese and the addition of vegetables, such as eggplant. Braciole are not exclusively eaten as a main dish, but also as a side dish at dinner, or in a sandwich at lunch.

After being stuffed and rolled, braciole are often tied with string or pinned with wooden toothpicks to hold in the stuffing.  After pan-frying to brown, the rolls of meat are placed into the sauce to finish cooking, still secured with string or toothpicks.

See also
 Braciolone
 Farsu magru
 Roulade
 Saltimbocca
 Scaloppine
 List of Italian dishes

References

Italian cuisine
Cuisine of Campania
Italian-American cuisine
Meat dishes
Australian cuisine
Goat dishes